Pattern Recognition in Bioinformatics (PRIB) was an international computer science conference covering pattern recognition algorithms in bioinformatics and computational biology. It was also the major event of Technical Committee 20 of the International Association for Pattern Recognition (IAPR), and has been held annually from 2006 to 2014 around the world. The articles appearing in the PRIB conference proceedings were published in Lecture Notes in Bioinformatics by Springer Science+Business Media.

The PRIB conference had its last edition in Cancun, Mexico in 2016.

Locations
 PRIB 2016, Cancun, Mexico, last edition
 PRIB 2014, Stockholm, Sweden
 PRIB 2013, Nice, France
 PRIB 2012, Tokyo, Japan
 PRIB 2011, Delft, Netherlands
 PRIB 2010, Nijmegen, Netherlands
 PRIB 2009, Sheffield, England, United Kingdom
 PRIB 2008, Melbourne, Australia
 PRIB 2007, Singapore
 PRIB 2006, Hong Kong, China, first edition

See also
 International Association for Pattern Recognition (IAPR)
 pattern recognition
 bioinformatics
 computational biology
 International Conference on Computational Intelligence Methods for Bioinformatics and Biostatistics (CIBB)

References

External links 
 Books of the PRIB proceedings published on Springer Lecture Notes in Bioinformatics from 2006 to 2014
 PRIB 2016 official website

Computer science conferences